Rozajella is a genus of beetles belonging to the family Leiodidae. There are currently three described species.

Species 

 Rozajella deelemani Perreau & Pavićević, 2008
 Rozajella jovanvladimiri S.Ćurčić, Brajković & B.Ćurčić, 2007
 Rozajella madzgalji Njunjić, Schilthuizen, Pavićević & Perreau, 2017

References 

Leiodidae
Beetle genera